These are the full results of the 2000 European Cup Super League in athletics which was held on 15 and 16 July 2000 at the Gateshead International Stadium in Gateshead, United Kingdom.

Team standings

Men's results

100 metres
15 JulyWind: +2.3 m/s

200 metres
16 JulyWind: 0.0 m/s

400 metres
15 July

800 metres
16 July

1500 metres
15 July

3000 metres
16 July

5000 metres
15 July

110 metres hurdles
16 JulyWind: +1.4 m/s

400 metres hurdles
15 July

3000 metres steeplechase
16 July

4 × 100 metres relay
15 July

4 × 400 metres relay
16 July

High jump
15 July

Pole vault
16 July

Long jump
15 July

Triple jump
16 July

Shot put
15 July

Discus throw
16 July

Hammer throw
16 July

Javelin throw
16 July

Women's results

100 metres
15 JulyWind: +2.9 m/s

200 metres
16 JulyWind: -0.3 m/s

400 metres
15 July

800 metres
15 July

1500 metres
16 July

3000 metres
15 July

5000 metres
16 July

100 metres hurdles
16 JulyWind: +0.2 m/s

400 metres hurdles
15 July

4 × 100 metres relay
15 July

4 × 400 metres relay
16 July

High jump
16 July

Pole vault
15 July

Long jump
16 July

Triple jump
16 July

Shot put
16 July

Discus throw
15 July

Hammer throw
15 July

Javelin throw
15 July

References

European Cup Super League
European
2000 in British sport
International athletics competitions hosted by the United Kingdom
Sport in Gateshead